Theodore Scott Glenn (born January 26) is an American actor. His roles have included Pfc Glenn Kelly in Nashville (1975), Wes Hightower in Urban Cowboy (1980), astronaut Alan Shepard in The Right Stuff (1983), Emmett in Silverado (1985), Captain Bart Mancuso in The Hunt for Red October (1990), Jack Crawford in The Silence of the Lambs (1991), John Adcox in Backdraft (1991), Montgomery Wick in Vertical Limit (2000), Roger in Training Day (2001), Ezra Kramer in The Bourne Ultimatum (2007), Kevin Garvey Sr. in  The Leftovers (2014–2017), and as Stick in both Daredevil (2015–2016) and The Defenders (2017).

Early life
Glenn has Irish and Native American ancestry. During his childhood, he was regularly ill, and for a year was bed-ridden, including having scarlet fever. Through intense training programs, he recovered from his illnesses, also overcoming a limp.

After graduating from a Pittsburgh High School, Glenn entered the College of William & Mary, where he majored in English. He joined the United States Marine Corps for three years, then worked for about seven months in 1963 as a news and sports reporter for the Kenosha News, in Kenosha, Wisconsin. He tried to become an author, but found he could not write dialogue that satisfied the readers. To learn the art of dialogue, he began taking acting classes.

Glenn made his Broadway debut in The Impossible Years in 1965. He joined George Morrison's acting class, helping direct student plays to pay for his studies and appearing onstage in La MaMa Experimental Theatre Club productions.

In 1968, he joined The Actors Studio and began working in professional theatre and TV. Two of Glenn's early television roles were as Hal Currin in the 1966 crime series Hawk, starring Burt Reynolds, and Calvin Brenner on the CBS daytime serial The Edge of Night. In 1970, director James Bridges offered him his first movie role, in The Baby Maker, released the same year.

Career
Glenn spent eight years in Los Angeles, California, acting in small roles in films and doing TV stints, including a TV movie Gargoyles. In 1978, Glenn left Los Angeles with his family for Ketchum, Idaho, and worked as a barman, huntsman, and mountain ranger, occasionally acting in Seattle stage productions. He appeared in Francis Ford Coppola's Apocalypse Now (1979) and worked with directors such as Jonathan Demme and Robert Altman.

In 1980, he appeared as ex-convict Wes Hightower in Bridges' Urban Cowboy. After that, he starred in the World War II horror film, The Keep (1983), and action films such as Wild Geese II (1985) opposite Laurence Olivier, Silverado (1985), and The Challenge (1982), and drama films such as The Right Stuff (1983), TV film Countdown to Looking Glass (1984), The River (1984), and Off Limits (1988) as he alternately played good guys and bad guys during the 1980s. He returned to Broadway in Burn This in 1987. That same year, he tried his hand at gangster movies when he starred as the real-life sheriff turned gunman Verne Miller in the movie Gangland: The Verne Miller Story, which was given a theatrical release only in Finland and went straight to video in the U.S.

In the beginning of the 1990s, Glenn's career was at its peak as he appeared in several well-known films, such as The Hunt for Red October (1990), The Silence of the Lambs (1991), Backdraft (1991), and The Player (1992). He played a vicious mob hitman in a critically acclaimed performance in Night of the Running Man (1995). Later, he gravitated toward more challenging movie roles, such as in the Freudian farce Reckless (1995), tragicomedy Edie & Pen (1997), and Ken Loach's sociopolitical declaration Carla's Song. In the late 1990s, Glenn alternated between mainstream films (Courage Under Fire (1996), Absolute Power (1997)), independent projects (Lesser Prophets (1997) and Larga distancia (1998), written by his daughter Dakota Glenn) and TV (Naked City: A Killer Christmas (1998). He was also cast in a supporting role in Training Day (2001). Glenn was cast in the FX drama Sons of Anarchy (2008), as Clay Morrow, but he was replaced after an early pilot episode by Ron Perlman. He portrayed Eugene van Wingerdt in a leading role in the thriller film The Barber. Glenn acted in the 2011 film Sucker Punch as Wise Man.

Glenn appeared in the drama Freedom Writers, in which he played the father of Hilary Swank's character, and in The Bourne Ultimatum and The Bourne Legacy as CIA Director Ezra Kramer.

He played the character Stick in Netflix's television series Daredevil and returned to the character in The Defenders series a year later.

Personal life
He married Carol Schwartz in 1968 and upon their marriage, Glenn converted to Judaism, his wife's faith, from Catholicism. They have two daughters.

Filmography

Film

Television

References

External links

 
 
 
 
 

20th-century American male actors
21st-century American male actors
Male actors from Pittsburgh
Actors from Kenosha, Wisconsin
American male film actors
American male television actors
College of William & Mary alumni
Jewish American male actors
Living people
United States Marines
Converts to Judaism
American people of Irish descent
People from Ketchum, Idaho
Year of birth missing (living people)